Mumbai Marines (MM), initially known as Mumbai Warriors, is a hockey team based in Mumbai, Maharashtra that plays in the World Series Hockey and led by Indian hockey team goalkeeper Adrian D'Souza. The team is owned by Ashish Bharatram (SRF Group) and Harish Thawani (Nimbus). It is coached by Andrew Meredith. Mahindra Hockey Stadium, Mumbai will serves as the home ground of Mumbai Marines.

Team was initially named as Mumbai Warriors but was rebranded to Mumbai Marines to avoid any confusions with Pune Warriors, the Pune IPL team.

Franchise Details

Ownership
ProSport Holdings, a consortium led by Ashish Bharatram (SRF Group) and Harish Thawani (Nimbus) was declared as the owner of the franchise. The consortium is a perfect mix of the 3 key essentials for any successful league – sport, business and entertainment.

The SRF Group is one of India’s most respected and leading business houses with a large international footprint. They have been rapidly expanding their operations in the textiles and chemicals business. Nimbus Communications Limited is one of India’s biggest sports rights management and marketing company and has successfully managed and marketed various commercial rights for global sports federations, including BCCI, ICC, IPL, Twenty20 EPL, Asian Cricket Council, and Indian Golf Union amongst many others.

Theme Music
Mumbai Marines' theme Dhin Chak Chak is composed by Shadaab Abhik.

Team Composition
The team is captained by Adrian D'Souza with Andrew Meredith as coach.

Fixtures and Results

2012

Statistics

Hat-tricks

References

See also
World Series Hockey

World Series Hockey teams
Sport in Mumbai
2011 establishments in Maharashtra
Field hockey clubs established in 2011